Belgium sent a delegation to compete at the 1964 Summer Paralympics in Tokyo, Japan.  Its athletes finished fourteenth in the overall medal count.

Archery
 Raymond Schelfaut (4th)

See also 
 1964 Summer Paralympics medal table
 Belgium at the 1964 Summer Olympics

References

External links 
1964 Summer Paralympics medal table 

Nations at the 1964 Summer Paralympics
1964
Summer Paralympics